Peperomia weberbaueri  is a species of Peperomia plant native to Peru. Some specimens can be found at an altitude of 1600 m in the Amazon.

Etymology
The species' epithet weberbaueri came from the surname of German naturalist and botanist Augusto Weberbauer. Weberbauer contributed to the exploration of new plant species of Peru and Andes.

See also
 Augusto Weberbauer

References

External links
 Eponyms of Augusto Weberbauer

weberbaueri
Flora of South America
Flora of Peru
Plants described in 1908
Taxa named by Casimir de Candolle